Cosmos 381 satellite provided data on the physical characteristics of the layers of the Earth's Ionosphere using a Mayak radio transmitter. The study covered almost the entire global surface.

Launch
It was launched to a Low Earth Orbit by a Kosmos-3 rocket (11K65M) from the LC–132/2 starting point at Plesetsk Cosmodrome on 2 December 1970.

Orbit
Orbit was 971 x 1013km. Inclination 74 degrees. Decay into the Earth's atmosphere is expected after about 1,200 years.

See also

 1970 in spaceflight

External links
 Űrhajózási lexikon. Chief editor Iván Almár. Budapest: Akadémiai – Zrínyi. 1981. 
 Lib.Cas
 Nasa-Gsfc
 Astronautix

References

Spacecraft launched in 1970
1970 in spaceflight
1970 in the Soviet Union
Kosmos satellites